Georgi Chilikov (born 23 August 1978 in Burgas) is a former Bulgarian footballer.

He was part of the Bulgarian 2004 European Football Championship team, which exited in the first round, finishing bottom of Group C, having finished top of Qualifying Group 8 in the pre-tournament phase. Chilikov scored his only goal for the national side in the 2:1 home win against Andorra on 16 October 2002 in a Euro 2004 qualifier.

Playing career
Chilikov was educated in Chernomorets' youth academy. From 1999 to 2001 he played for the other club from Burgas – Naftex. His move from Naftex to PFC Levski (Sofia) made him the record holder of the highest transfer between Bulgarian clubs. In June 2001, PFC Levski (Sofia) signed Chilikov to a four-year deal for a record €1.25 million. During his time with the "blues", Chilikov established himself as a dependable goal-scorer. On 24 April 2004, he netted a last-minute goal against archrivals CSKA Sofia in an A PFG match to help his team to a 2:1 away win. On 28 August 2002, Chilikov failed to convert a penalty in the 0:1 loss against Ukrainian side Dynamo Kyiv in a third qualifying round Champions League match. In 2005, he moved to Portugal Nacional Madeira. In June 2007, Chilikov was loaned out to CSKA Sofia for one year and 50 000 euros price. Despite some reservations on the part of the CSKA supporters (due to the time he had spent at Levski Sofia), Chilikov quickly managed to win them over. On 11 August 2007, he netted an equalizing goal in an A PFG match against Litex Lovech. On 30 August 2007, Chilikov scored a last-minute goal against Cypriot side AC Omonia in a UEFA Cup game and helped his team advance to the next stage. However, despite generally impressing in his substitute appearances, Chilikov failed to establish himself as part of the starting 11. In January 2008, he was transferred to Chinese club Dalian Shide. After that he had brief stints with FC Tobol, Chernomorets Burgas and Lokomotiv Plovdiv.

Coaching career
From July to September 2010 he served as assistant manager in Neftochimic Burgas. Chilikov was assistant manager in Chernomorets Burgas from June 2011 to May 2014. In July 2016, Chilikov was assigned as coach of PFC Levski (Sofia) U17 youth academy team. Between October 2016–June 2017 he was the Head Scout of Levski Sofia and was in charge of the team's selection.

On 9 June 2017, Chilikov was appointed as manager of Second League club Oborishte Panagyurishte. In August 2017, only after a month in charge of Oborishte, Chilikov was appointed as an assistant manager of Ludogorets Razgrad. In September 2021, Chilikov became the head coach of Arda Kardzhali. He parted ways with the Kardzhali team in November 2021.

Playing style

Chilikov is known for his powerful heading ability.

International career

Between 2002 and 2004, Chilikov earned 7 caps for Bulgaria, scoring one goal.

International goal
Scores and results list Bulgaria's goal tally first.

Honours
Levski Sofia
 Bulgarian League: 2002
 Bulgarian Cup: 2002, 2003, 2005
 A PFG Top goalscorer: 2003 (22 goals)

References

External links 
  Official player website from LEVSKI2000
 Profile
 Profile at Levskisofia.info

1978 births
Living people
Bulgarian footballers
Bulgaria international footballers
Bulgarian expatriate footballers
FC Chernomorets Burgas players
Neftochimic Burgas players
PFC Levski Sofia players
C.D. Nacional players
PFC CSKA Sofia players
Dalian Shide F.C. players
FC Tobol players
PFC Chernomorets Burgas players
PFC Lokomotiv Plovdiv players
UEFA Euro 2004 players
First Professional Football League (Bulgaria) players
Primeira Liga players
Chinese Super League players
Kazakhstan Premier League players
Bulgarian expatriate sportspeople in Portugal
Bulgarian expatriate sportspeople in China
Bulgarian expatriate sportspeople in Kazakhstan
Expatriate footballers in Portugal
Expatriate footballers in China
Expatriate footballers in Kazakhstan
Sportspeople from Burgas
Association football forwards